The Madman's Tale is a novel written by John Katzenbach. It was published and released in 2004.

Plot summary
Francis Petrel, recently released from an asylum faces his own inner demons as he recounts his memories of a murderer in the asylum during his time there. The story tells itself in two parallel parts: one of the stories is during his time in the asylum, all a memory slowly bringing itself back to life; the other story takes place after he is released, and he feels compelled to author a book on the events surrounding that murder. He has no paper, so he writes his story on the wall and is constantly challenged with tedious interruptions. At the same time, he forgoes his medication, and the tension of continuing with his work becomes threatened by his struggle with his own madness.

Reception
Washington Post reviewer Patrick Anderson wrote that the novel could be "sometimes over the top" however was "a tour de force, superior storytelling designed to scare your pants off and likely to succeed".

Film adaptation

The motion picture adaptation of The Madman's Tale was to be filmed between October 26, 2007 and January 8, 2008 at Fairfield Hills Hospital in Newtown, Connecticut. Due to lead actor Jonathan Rhys Meyers personal issues, production was stopped before filming began.

References

2004 novels
Novels about mental health